Xi Hongyan (born March 17, 1964) is a Chinese ice dancer. She competed at the 1984 Winter Olympics with partner Zhao Xiaolei and placed 19th. She was 19 at the time.

Following her retirement from competitive skating, she became a coach. Her current and former students include Huang Xintong & Zheng Xun, Guo Jiameimei & Meng Fei, Yu Xiaoyang & Wang Chen, and Qi Jia & Sun Xu.

References

 Skatabase: 1980s Olympics Results

Chinese female ice dancers
Olympic figure skaters of China
Figure skaters at the 1984 Winter Olympics
Chinese figure skating coaches
1964 births
Living people
Female sports coaches
Figure skaters from Heilongjiang